The yellow-breasted fruit dove (Ptilinopus occipitalis) locally known as balorinay is a species of bird in the family Columbidae. It is endemic to the Philippines. Its natural habitat is tropical moist lowland forest. While it is listed as least concern in IUCN, it is declining due to habitat loss, hunting and trapping for the illegal wildlife trade.

It is illegal to hunt, capture or keep yellow-breasted fruit-doves under Philippine Law RA 9147.

Taxonomy and systematics 
The yellow-breasted fruit dove is one of over 50 species in the genus Ptilinopus. Within the genus, it is most closely allied to the red-eared fruit dove and the Lompobattang fruit dove.

The species was formerly placed in the obsolete genus Leucotreron.

The species' generic name comes from the Ancient Greek ptilon (feather) and pous (foot), while the specific epithet occipitalis is from Latin, meaning "of the back of the head". Alternative names for the yellow-breasted fruit dove include sulphur-breasted fruit dove.

There are two recognised subspecies. However, they are recognised only on the basis on minor differences in size and plumage, and may be better treated as monotypic.

 P. o. occipitalis – Gray & Mitchell, 1844: The nominate subspecies, it is found in the north and central Philippines from southern Luzon to Negros, Bohol, and Leyte.
 P. o. incognitus – Tweeddale, 1877: It is found in the southeastern Philippines, in the mountains of Dinagat, Camiguin, Mindanao and Basilan. Birds from the Mindanao highlands have occasionally been separated as brevipes on the basis of differences in plumage.

References

Cited text 

 

yellow-breasted fruit dove
Endemic birds of the Philippines
yellow-breasted fruit dove
yellow-breasted fruit dove
Taxonomy articles created by Polbot
Taxobox binomials not recognized by IUCN